Girey may refer to:
Girey, Russia, an urban-type settlement in Krasnodar Krai, Russia
Gəray, a village in Azerbaijan